The history of the United States men's national soccer team began with that team's first international match in 1916. Highlights from the team's early history include reaching the semi-finals of the 1930 World Cup then FIFA recognized third place for the United States of America in 1986, and defeating England in a remarkable upset in the 1950 World Cup.

The United States men's national soccer team improved during the 1980s, and played in every World Cup from 1990 to 2014. The team's best performances in modern history include reaching the quarterfinals of the 2002 World Cup, and defeating #1 ranked Spain to reach the final of the 2009 Confederations Cup.

Early history: 1885–1904

In 1885, the United States and Canada played at Newark, New Jersey, making it the first international match held outside of the United Kingdom; the Canadians won the match 1–0.  The following year, a fixture at the same venue resulted in the U.S. winning after scoring the only goal of the game. Neither match was officially recognized.

Thirty years later, on August 20, 1916, the United States played its first official international match under the auspices of U.S. Soccer against Sweden in Stockholm, which the U.S. won 3–2, with goals from Dick Spalding, Charles Ellis and Harry Cooper.

The U.S. won both the silver and bronze medals in men's soccer at the 1904 Summer Olympics held in St. Louis, Missouri. The tournament featured three teams: Galt F.C. from Canada and Christian Brothers College and St. Rose Parish from the United States (early Olympic soccer tournaments featured club teams instead of national teams). Galt defeated both American teams to win the gold. Christian Brothers defeated St. Rose in a third match after two scoreless draws.

1930s: Third Place at the first World Cup 

In the 1930 World Cup, the U.S. won their first match in World Cup history, beating Belgium 3–0 at the Estadio Gran Parque Central in Montevideo, Uruguay. The match occurred simultaneously with another across town at the Estadio Pocitos where France defeated Mexico.

In the next match, the United States again won 3–0, this time against Paraguay. For many years, FIFA credited Bert Patenaude with the first and third goals and his teammate Tom Florie with the second. Other sources described the second goal as having been scored by Patenaude or by Paraguayan Aurelio González. In November 2006, FIFA announced that it had accepted evidence from "various historians and football fans" that Patenaude scored all three goals, and was thus the first person to score a hat trick in a World Cup finals tournament.

Having reached the semifinals with two wins, the American side lost 6–1 to Argentina. Using the overall tournament records, FIFA lists the U.S. as finishing in Third Place, above fellow semifinalist Yugoslavia. This is still the team's highest World Cup finish, and the highest finish of any CONCACAF nation. Furthermore, it is the only time a national team from outside the traditional powerhouse regions of CONMEBOL (South America) and UEFA (Europe) have finished on the podium.

1950 World Cup: upset of England
In the 1950 World Cup, the United States lost their first match 3–1 against Spain, but then won 1–0 against England in what is widely considered one of the greatest upsets in football history, England having recently beaten the rest of Europe 6–1 in an exhibition match. Sports Illustrated and Soccer Digest have called the game the "Miracle on Grass." A 5–2 defeat by Chile in the third group match saw the U.S. eliminated from the tournament. It would be four decades before the United States would make another appearance at the World Cup.

1950s–1970s
Despite the United States' relative success in early international tournaments, soccer remained a niche sport in the U.S. for many years. In the three decades after the 1950 World Cup, the only victories for the United States came against Haiti, Bermuda, Honduras, Canada, Poland, and China.

1980s
After the enthusiasm caused by the creation and rise of the North American Soccer League in the 1960s and 1970s, it seemed as though the U.S. men's national team would soon become a powerful force in world soccer. These hopes were not realized, however. The United States played only two international matches from 1981 to 1983.

To provide a more stable national team program and renew interest in the NASL, U.S. Soccer entered the national team into the league for the 1983 season as Team America. This team lacked the continuity and regularity of training that conventional clubs enjoy, and many players were unwilling to play for the team instead of their own clubs. Embarrassingly, Team America finished the season at the bottom of the league.  U.S Soccer cancelled this experiment, and the national team was withdrawn from the NASL.

U.S. Soccer targeted the 1984 Summer Olympics in Los Angeles, California and the 1986 World Cup as means of rebuilding the national team and their fan base. The International Olympic Committee declared that teams from outside Europe and South America could field full senior teams, including professionals (until then, the amateur-only rule had heavily favored socialist countries from Eastern Europe whose players were professionals in all but name). The U.S. had a very strong showing at the tournament, beating Costa Rica, tying Egypt, losing only to favorite Italy and finishing 1–1–1 but didn't make the second round, losing to Egypt on a tiebreaker (both had three points, but Egypt had scored one more goal than the United States).

The United States bid to host the 1986 World Cup, after Colombia withdrew from hosting due to economic concerns. However, Mexico beat the U.S. and Canada to host the tournament, despite concerns that the tournament would have to be moved again because of a major earthquake that hit Mexico shortly before the tournament.

By the end of 1984, the NASL had folded and there was no senior outdoor soccer league operating in the United States. As a result, many top American players, such as John Kerr, Paul Caligiuri, Eric Eichmann, and Bruce Murray, moved overseas, primarily to Europe.

In the last game of the qualifying tournament for the 1986 World Cup, the U.S. needed only a draw against Costa Rica, whom the U.S. had beaten 3–0 in the Olympics the year before, to reach the final qualification group against Honduras and Canada. U.S. Soccer scheduled the game to be played at El Camino College in Torrance, California, an area with many Costa Rican expatriates, and marketed the game almost exclusively to the Costa Rican community, even providing Costa Rican folk dances as halftime entertainment. A 35th-minute goal by Evaristo Coronado won the match for Costa Rica and kept the United States from reaching its first World Cup since 1950.

In 1988, U.S. Soccer attempted to reimplement its national-team-as-club concept, offering contracts to national team players, to build an international team with something of a club ethos, while loaning them out to their club teams, saving U.S. Soccer the expense of their salaries. This brought many key veterans back to the team, while the success of the NASL a decade earlier had created an influx of talent from burgeoning grass-roots level clubs and youth programs. Thus U.S. Soccer sought to establish a more stable foundation for participation in the 1990 World Cup than had existed for previous tournaments.

1990s: Rebirth for American soccer

1990 World Cup
In 1988, FIFA named the United States hosts of the 1994 World Cup, but it did so under significant international criticism because of the perceived weakness of the national team and the lack of a professional outdoor league. This criticism diminished somewhat when a 1–0 win against Trinidad and Tobago, the U.S.'s first away win in nearly two years, in the last match of the 1989 CONCACAF Championship, earned the United States their first World Cup appearance in 40 years.

When the Americans qualified for the 1990 FIFA World Cup, the U.S. had no professional outdoor league, had not participated in World Cup play since 1950, and U.S. youth national team programs were only a decade old. With the U.S. set to host the 1994 FIFA World Cup, manager Bob Gansler and his assistants, Joe Machnik and Ralph Perez, selected a squad to compete at Italia 1990 and gain valuable World Cup experience for 1994.  

Several older professionals who had played in the NASL, MISL, or semiprofessional leagues were not selected, including Rick Davis and Hugo Perez, who were recovering from serious injuries. With a young, inexperienced team, the U.S. lost their group stage matches to Czechoslovakia (5-1), Italy (1-0) and Austria (2-1).  

Six players from the 1990 World Cup roster — Marcelo Balboa, Paul Caligiuri, John Harkes, Tony Meola, Tab Ramos, and Eric Wynalda — featured for the U.S. at USA 1994. All six started each match during group play, with Meola, Balboa, Caligiuri, and Ramos also starting the Quarterfinal match against Brazil.

CONCACAF success
In March 1991, the United States won the North America Cup, tying Mexico 2–2 and beating Canada 2–0. This was followed in May by a 1–0 victory over Uruguay in the World Series of Soccer. The national team then went undefeated in the 1991 Gold Cup, beating Mexico 2–0 in the semifinals and Honduras 4–3 on penalty kicks after a 0–0 draw in the final. In 1992, the U.S. continued its run of success, taking the U.S. Cup with victories over Ireland and Portugal, followed by a draw with Italy.

Hosting the 1994 World Cup
Having qualified automatically as host, the U.S. opened their tournament schedule with a 1–1 draw against Switzerland in the Pontiac Silverdome in the suburbs of Detroit, the first World Cup game played indoors. In its second game, the U.S. faced Colombia, then ranked fourth in the world, at the Rose Bowl, and the United States won 2–1. Despite a 1–0 loss to Romania in its final group game, the U.S. made it to the knockout round for the first time since 1930.

In the second round, the U.S. lost 1–0 to the eventual champion Brazil.

1998 World Cup
In the 1998 World Cup in France, the team lost all of their three group matches, 0–2 to Germany, 1–2 to Iran, and 0–1 to Yugoslavia, and so finished in last place in its group and 32nd in the field of 32. Head coach Steve Sampson received much of the blame for the performance as a result of abruptly cutting team captain John Harkes, whom Sampson had named "Captain for Life" shortly before, as well as several other players who were instrumental to the qualifying effort, from the squad. Sampson kept secret the reason for dropping Harkes for years, and it was not until February 2010 that Eric Wynalda publically revealed in front of a gathering of news media that this was due to Harkes having an "inappropriate relationship" with Wynalda's wife at the time.  Sampson confirmed this to be true a few days later.

2000s: A power in CONCACAF

2002 FIFA World Cup: quarter-finalists
The United States won the 2002 Gold Cup to set up the team's best performance since 1930 in the 2002 World Cup, when the U.S. team reached the quarter-finals. The knockout stage was reached through a 3–2 win over Portugal and a 1–1 tie with co-host and eventual fourth-place finisher, South Korea, rendering a 3–0 loss to Poland in the final game irrelevant.

This set the stage for a Round 2 face-off with familiar continental rivals Mexico. The U.S. emerged victorious in the first World Cup showdown between the two old adversaries, 2–0. The team lost 1–0 to eventual runners-up Germany in the quarterfinals after a controversial no-call on a handball committed by the Germans thwarted an American goal. The United States followed up this success by winning their third Gold Cup, and second out of three, in 2005.

2006 FIFA World Cup: High hopes and disappointment
After finishing top of the CONCACAF qualification tournament, the U.S. were drawn into Group E along with the Czech Republic, Italy, and Ghana. Since three of the teams were ranked in the top 10 of the FIFA World Rankings at the time, it was considered a group of death.

The United States opened their tournament with a 3–0 defeat to the Czech Republic. The team then drew 1–1 against Italy, the only game which the Italians failed to win before the tournament final against France. The United States were then knocked out of the tournament after being beaten 2–1 by Ghana in their final group match.

2010 FIFA World Cup cycle 
MLS coach Bob Bradley was named interim manager on December 8, 2006, following the team's disappointing showing in the 2006 World Cup. Bradley started with a series of friendly matches and led the team to a 3–0–1 record. This included wins over Ecuador, Denmark, and rival Mexico. After this early success, the U.S. Soccer Federation removed Bradley's interim title on May 15, 2007, and he became the 33rd coach in the history of the Men's National Team.

From 2007 to 2009, the United States national team played 16 international friendly matches with a record of 9–4–3. Notable matches include a 2–0 victory over Mexico, a 0–0 tie with Argentina, 2–0 victories over Sweden in 2008, and 3–2 victory against Sweden in 2009.

2007 
The U.S. played in the 2007 CONCACAF Gold Cup. The United States won their 3 games in the group stage to win their group. In the elimination round, the U.S. defeated Panama 2–1 in the quarter-finals. The United States then defeated Canada in the semi-finals 2–1. 
This set up a championship match between the United States and Mexico at Soldier Field in Chicago. The United States trailed 1–0 at halftime. The United States scored in the second half with goals from Landon Donovan and Benny Feilhaber, and held on to win 2–1 for their second straight Gold Cup title.

Copa America is a tournament hosted by CONMEBOL (Confederation of South American Football).  The team played three matches in this tournament. The Copa América games were played very shortly after the Gold Cup, so the majority of the players who played in the Copa matches were the substitutes for the team. These three matches were against Argentina, Paraguay, and Colombia; all losses for the American team. The team failed to advance out of the group stage and many blamed Bob Bradley for bringing a weakened squad to the tournament.

2009 
The highlight of summer 2009 was the 2009 Confederations Cup, where the U.S. was drawn into Group B with Brazil, Egypt, and Italy. After losing 3–1 to Italy and 3–0 to Brazil, on the final day of group play the United States beat Egypt 3–0. This meant that the United States finished second in the group and reached the semi-finals.
In the semifinals, the U.S. defeated Spain 2–0. At the time, Spain was atop the FIFA World Rankings and was on a record run of 15 straight wins and 35 games undefeated (a record shared with Brazil).  With the win, the United States advanced to its first-ever final in a men's FIFA tournament; however, the team lost 3–2 to Brazil after leading 2–0 at half-time.

The United States hosted the 2009 Gold Cup. Coach Bob Bradley chose a side consisting of mostly reserves.  The U.S. concluded group play with two victories and a draw.
In the quarterfinals, the United States defeated Panama 2–1, and in the semifinals the U.S. defeated Honduras 2–0. In the final the United States was beaten by Mexico 5–0, surrendering its 58-match unbeaten streak against CONCACAF opponents on U.S. soil. It was also the first home loss to Mexico since 1999.

2010 World Cup Qualification 
In 2008, the team started 2010 World Cup Qualifications. The U.S. defeated Barbados in a 2-leg home-and-away competition.
The U.S. won seven of eight matches in the Second and Third Rounds of qualification for the 2010 World Cup in South Africa. This qualified the United States for the Fourth round, or Hexagonal, against Costa Rica, El Salvador, Honduras, Mexico, and Trinidad and Tobago.

The U.S. began the Fourth round by beating Mexico 2–0, a loss that extended Mexico's losing streak against America on U.S. soil to 11 matches. Next, the United States earned a 2–2 draw away to El Salvador. Four days later, Jozy Altidore became the youngest U.S. player to score a hat-trick, and lead the United States to a 3–0 victory over Trinidad and Tobago. Next, the U.S. travelled to Costa Rica, where they were defeated 3–1. The United States rebounded three days later when they defeated Honduras 2–1. Near the end of the summer of 2009, the United States suffered a 2–1 loss to Mexico at Estadio Azteca. A few weeks later, the United States defeated El Salvador 2–1 at home. The next week, the U.S. beat Trinidad and Tobago 1–0. On October 10, 2009, the United States secured qualification to the World Cup with a 3–2 win over Honduras.  Four days later, the U.S. secured first place in the Fourth round with a 2–2 draw against Costa Rica.

2010s

2010 FIFA World Cup 
In the 2010 FIFA World Cup, the U.S. team were drawn in Group C against England, Slovenia and Algeria. After drawing against England (1–1) and Slovenia (2–2), the US defeated Algeria through a Landon Donovan stoppage time goal, the first time the U.S. had won its group since 1930. In the round of 16, the U.S. was eliminated by Ghana, 2–1. On FIFA's ranking of World Cup teams the U.S. finished in 12th place.

2011 Gold Cup 
In preparation for the 2011 CONCACAF Gold Cup, the U.S. played three friendlies; a 1–1 draw to Argentina, a 1–0 loss to Paraguay, and a 4–0 loss to Spain.

The United States hosted the 2011 Gold Cup. The U.S. advanced past the group stage with a pair of victories over Guadeloupe and Canada, despite losing to Panama 2–1. This was the first defeat for the U.S. in a Gold Cup group stage match, and its first ever loss to Panama. In the quarterfinals, the United States defeated Jamaica 2–0. In the semifinals the U.S. avenged their group stage defeat with a 1–0 victory over Panama, and advanced to its fourth consecutive Gold Cup final, where the team faced Mexico in a rematch of the 2009 Gold Cup final. The United States was beaten by Mexico 4–2, extending Mexico's winning streak against the U.S. to three matches. It was also the second consecutive loss to Mexico on American soil.

Following the loss, Bob Bradley was relieved of his duties as coach. On July 29, 2011, Jürgen Klinsmann was named as the national team's head coach.

2012 
After their first six matches resulted in only a win and a draw against four losses, the U.S. embarked on a five-game winning streak. On February 29, 2012, the team won 1–0 in Italy, the first ever win for the United States over Italy. In 2012, the team began its World Cup qualification, and topped their third round qualification group with four wins, one draw and one defeat.

On June 2, 2013, the U.S. played a friendly against 2nd-ranked Germany in its Centennial celebration match at a sold out RFK Stadium in Washington D.C.  The US won 4–3. This was the USMNT's first win over a top 2 ranked team since the 2009 FIFA Confederations Cup.

2013 
On June 6, 2013, the US beat Jamaica 2–1. On June 11, the U.S. beat Panama 2–0 at CenturyLink Field in Seattle in front of almost 41,000 fans, the seventh largest crowd for a World Cup Qualifier on U.S. soil. The game also drew the second largest TV audience on ESPN for a U.S. World Cup Qualifier. On June 18, the U.S. followed with a 1–0 victory over Honduras at Rio Tinto Stadium. In July 2013, the US hosted and played in the 2013 CONCACAF Gold Cup where they went undefeated in the group stage and won with a 1–0 victory over Panama in the final, a victory which represented a record 11th straight win. A 4–3 victory over Bosnia in an international friendly match in Sarajevo represented the 12th straight win for the USMNT, the longest winning streak for any team in the world at that time. In the win, Jozy Altidore scored a hat trick (the second of his career) and in doing so became the first U.S. player to score a goal in five consecutive games. The match was also the USMNT's first-ever come-from-behind win in Europe.

On September 6, 2013, the 12 game winning streak came to an end when the U.S. lost to Costa Rica 3–1 at San Jose, Costa Rica. By defeating Mexico four days later, followed shortly thereafter by a 2–2 draw between Panama and Honduras, the U.S. clinched a spot in the 2014 World Cup. Next the United States beat Jamaica on the score 2–0 two late goals by Zusi and Altidore. The U.S. then defeated Panama 3–2 with two goals in stoppage time from Graham Zusi and Aron Jóhannsson.

2014 FIFA World Cup
For the 2014 FIFA World Cup, the U.S. was drawn into Group G, along with Ghana, Germany, and Portugal. In game 1 the U.S. defeated Ghana 2–1. After Clint Dempsey scored the first goal just 29 seconds into the match, the U.S. held onto a 1–0 lead until a pass by Ghana in the box allowed André Ayew to score and tie the match 1–1 in the 82nd minute. Then, just 4 minutes later, the U.S. scored on a header off of a corner kick taken by Graham Zusi, first headed by Geoff Cameron, and then headed immediately by John Brooks, to give the U.S. the winning goal. Brooks was the first U.S. substitute player to have scored a goal in World Cup play. The Americans then played against Portugal, drawing 2–2 after conceding a last-second goal. They held Germany to a surprising 1–0 defeat in the final group game. In the Round of 16, the American team faced off against Belgium. Despite a goal in the 2nd half of the extra time scored by Julian Green, it was not enough from losing 2–1 against the Belgians, thus resulting in their second straight elimination since the 2010 FIFA World Cup.

2015 Gold Cup
The national team's next tournament under Klinsmann was the 2015 CONCACAF Gold Cup. After qualifying from the group stage with wins over Honduras and Haiti and a draw against Panama, the U.S. defeated Cuba in the quarterfinals. However, the U.S. were eliminated by Jamaica in the semi-finals by a 2–1 score before losing to Panama on penalties in the third place match. The fourth-place finish was the worst Gold Cup performance by the national team since 2000, and the first time the team failed to make the tournament final since 2003. In the 2015 CONCACAF Cup playoff to determine the region's entry to the 2017 FIFA Confederations Cup, the U.S. were defeated 3–2 by Mexico at the Rose Bowl.

2017 Gold Cup 
After their disappointing fourth-place finish at the 2015 Gold Cup, the United States finished at the top of their group stage at the 2017 CONCACAF Gold Cup, with a 1–1 draw with Panama, a 3–2 win over Martinique and a 3–0 win against Nicaragua. In the quarterfinals, they beat El Salvador 2–0, with both goals scored in the first half. They also got a 2–0 win over Costa Rica in the semi-finals. In the final, they faced against Jamaica, who knocked them out in the semi-finals of the 2015 tournament. They won the game 2–1, thanks to a winner from Jordan Morris in the final minutes of the game, and the Stars and Stripes earned their 6th ever Gold Cup triumph.

2018 FIFA World Cup qualification 
On November 13, 2015, the United States played their first 2018 FIFA World Cup qualification match against Saint Vincent and the Grenadines in the CONCACAF Fourth Round, whom they beat 6–1. Four days later, they got a 0–0 draw with Trinidad and Tobago. Six months after that in March 2016, the United States would suffer a 2–0 loss to Guatemala, but win the return leg 4 days later, with a 4–0 win at Mapfre Stadium. They would win their remaining two matches, and qualify for the CONCACAF Fifth Round, at the top of their group stage, with Trinidad and Tobago finishing second. Their qualification campaign in the Fifth Round started shaky, with consecutive losses to Mexico and Costa Rica. They wouldn't earn their first win until March 2017, with a 6–0 win against Honduras. Four days later, they got a 1–1 draw with Panama, when the U.S. conceded Panama's equalizer in the 43rd minute. Klinsmann was fired by the USSF on 21 November 2016 and replaced by LA Galaxy manager Bruce Arena. The US would earn only 5 points in their next 4 games, before they defeated Panama 4–0 at Exploria Stadium in Orlando, Florida. They needed at least a draw in their final match against Trinidad and Tobago, to automatically qualify for the 2018 FIFA World Cup finals, but a shocking 2–1 win for the Soca Warriors ended America's streak of competing in every World Cup since 1990.

2019 Gold Cup 
The United States came into the 2019 Gold Cup as the defending champions looking for back to back victories.  They won all 3 group stage matches with a 4–0 win over Guyana, a 6–0 win over Trinidad and Tobago, and a 1–0 win over Panama.  They beat Curaçao 1–0 in the Quarter-finals and Jamaica 3–1 in the Semis to move on to a final matchup with Mexico.  The final was scoreless through 72 minutes but a 73rd-minute goal by Jonathan dos Santos secured a 1–0 win for Mexico.

2020s

2021 CONCACAF Nations League 
In the 2019-20 Nations League the United States received automatic qualification to League A after participating in the Hex in the 2018 CONCACAF World Cup Qualifiers.  The United States topped group A over Canada and Cuba to move on the inaugural Nations League Finals.  The USA played Honduras in the Nationals League Semi-finals on June 3, 2021, at Empower Field at Mile High, Denver.  The United States moved on to the finals thanks to an 89th-minute Jordan Siebatcheu  goal that set up a rematch of the 2019 Gold Cup Final against Mexico.  On June 6, 2021, the USMNT won the inaugural CONCACAF Nations League in an instant classic 3–2 win after extra time.  The United States went down 1-0 after the first minute but a Gio Reyna goal equalized the game at 1-1.  After going down again thanks to a goal by Diego Lainez the USMNT equalized on a Weston McKinnie header.  A Christian Pulisic Penalty in Extra time won the game on the tournament for the United States.

2021 Gold Cup 
The United States came into the 2021 Gold Cup after a finals lost in the previous tournament. Despite bringing a team of mostly reserve players to the tournament, the United States topped Group B win a 1–0 win over Haiti, a 6–1 win over Martinique, and a 1–0 win over Canada.  This put them into the Quarter-finals against Jamaica, with the US winning 1–0 and advancing in the semi finals against Qatar. They won against Qatar 1-0 putting them into the finals against Mexico, where, after a scoreless 90 minutes, a Miles Robinson header in the 116th minute resulted in a 1-0 extra time victory and gave the US their seventh Gold Cup title.

2022 World Cup qualification
Due to schedule changes caused by the pandemic, the traditional Hexagonal became an Octagonal, which the United States automatically qualified for as one of the top-five CONCACAF teams in the FIFA rankings, alongside Mexico, Costa Rica, Honduras, and Jamaica. Joining them were three teams who had advanced from the second round: El Salvador, Canada, and Panama. Team USA ultimately finished third, ensuring their return to World Cup competition after their absence in 2018, despite fielding the youngest team out of the 32 qualified nations with an average age of just 24 years. Highlights included a 4–1 victory away to Honduras, which was the United States' first road victory in the final round of World Cup qualifying since defeating Panama in 2013, a victory against Mexico–USA's third straight against them in all competitions–by the infamous "Dos A Cero" scoreline, a grueling 3–0 home win against Honduras, where the extreme cold temperatures of Minnesota caused U.S. goalkeeper Matt Turner as well as several Honduran players to suffer from frostbite, and a 5–1 drubbing of Panama, in which Christian Pulisic scored his first ever hat-trick for the national team.

See also
 History of soccer in the United States
 United States at the FIFA World Cup
 United States at the CONCACAF Gold Cup

References

External links
 

 
United States men's national soccer team
United States